Manni Lal is an Indian politician. He was elected to the Lok Sabha,  the lower house of the Parliament of India from Hardoi, Uttar Pradesh in 1980 as a member of the Indian National Congress.

References

External links
 Official Biographical Sketch Member of Parliament Manni Lal

1942 births
India MPs 1980–1984
Lok Sabha members from Uttar Pradesh
Living people
People from Hardoi district